The twenty-first season of the American animated television series The Simpsons aired on Fox from September 27, 2009, to May 23, 2010. It was the first of two seasons that the show was renewed for by Fox, and also the first season of the show to air entirely in high definition.

With this season, The Simpsons established itself as the longest-running American primetime television series surpassing Gunsmoke.

The season received mainly positive reviews from critics, with many praising "The Squirt and the Whale", "To Surveil with Love" and "The Bob Next Door". The show moved up 16 positions in the Nielsen ratings from the previous season and received numerous award nominations, winning two — an Emmy Award for Anne Hathaway for her voicing in "Once Upon a Time in Springfield", and an Annie Award for "Treehouse of Horror XX".

Production
The season featured eight holdover episodes from season 20’s LABF production line. John Frink was credited as an executive producer for the first time. It also featured fifteen episodes from the season’s MABF production line.

20th anniversary
In 2009, to celebrate the 20th anniversary of the premiere of The Simpsons, Fox announced that a year-long celebration of the show titled "Best. 20 Years. Ever." would run from January 14, 2009 to January 14, 2010.

As part of the celebration, documentary filmmaker Morgan Spurlock directed and produced The Simpsons 20th Anniversary Special – In 3-D! On Ice!, a documentary special that examined the "cultural phenomenon of The Simpsons". Despite the title, Spurlock said the special "most likely [would] not be in 3-D nor on ice." Production began at Comic-Con 2009, and the show aired on January 10, 2010 on Fox.  It included interviews with the cast and fans of the show.

For the week of November 9, 2009, several Fox shows including House, Lie to Me, Bones and Fringe featured clues and homages to the show as part of an "on-air scavenger hunt". Viewers who spotted the clues could win prizes at Fox.com. Marge also appeared on the cover of the November issue of Playboy.

The milestone was also celebrated in the United Kingdom with three special programmes, all twenty minutes long and entitled The Simpsons: Access All Areas, Simpsons...Mischief and Mayhem and Simpsons...Celebrity Friends respectively. They aired on Sky1 and Sky1 HD on three separate evenings from January 11 to 13, 2010. They were followed by the UK premiere of season 21's first episode, "Homer the Whopper".

Reception

Critical reception
Robert Canning of IGN gave the season an 8.3 (improving 0.4 from the previous season) saying that it was "Impressive". He criticized the opening part of the season (other than "Homer the Whopper" and "Treehouse of Horror XX"), but praised almost every episode after "Once Upon a Time in Springfield", and considered "The Squirt and the Whale" and "The Bob Next Door" to be the season's best episodes. He also stated "the improved consistency of memorable episodes this season over years past proved that, even after 20 years, The Simpsons can still entertain".

TV Fanatic called the season "great" while reviewing "Judge Me Tender", while Emily VanDerWerff of The A.V. Club, while reviewing the same episode, stated "I think it's picked back up in the last few seasons and particularly in this season, which has had a lot of fun episodes in it."

"The Squirt and the Whale" was also praised for its chalkboard gag, which made a reference to the controversial South Park episodes "200" and "201", while "To Surveil with Love" was considered the "best episode in years" by Sharon Knolle of TV Squad and "one of the better outings" by Ariel Ponywether of FireFox News.

Ratings
In the seasonal Nielsen ratings in the 18-49 demographic, the season ranked joint 33rd with a 3.4/9 average. It also ranked 61st in the seasonal total viewers with an average of 7.208 million viewers.

The most viewed and highest rated episode of the season was "Once Upon a Time in Springfield", watched by an estimated 14.62 million households and with a Nielsen rating of 6.9/17 in the 18-49 demographic. The following episode, "Million Dollar Maybe", was the least viewed and lowest rated, watched by an estimated 5.110 million households and receiving a Nielsen rating of 2.4/6 in the 18-49 demographic, although this was largely down to the fact that it aired against the 2010 Grammy Awards on CBS and the 2010 Pro Bowl on ESPN.

Awards

Anne Hathaway won the Emmy Award for Outstanding Voice-Over Performance for voicing Princess Penelope in "Once Upon a Time in Springfield", while Dan Castellaneta and Hank Azaria were also nominated for "Thursdays with Abie" and "Moe Letter Blues" respectively. "Treehouse of Horror XX" won for Writing in a Television Production at the Annie Awards. "Once Upon a Time in Springfield" also received an Emmy nomination for Outstanding Animated Program, while The Simpsons 20th Anniversary Special - In 3-D! On Ice! was nominated for Outstanding Nonfiction Special. The show was also once again nominated for Favorite Cartoon at the 2010 Kids' Choice Awards. The season is currently nominated for three awards at the 2010 Writers Guild of America Awards. Stephanie Gills is nominated for writing "Moe Letter Blues" as well as Matt Selman who is nominated for "Oh Brother, Where Bart Thou?". The Simpsons 20th Anniversary Special — In 3-D! On Ice! is also nominated for Comedy/Variety – Music, Awards, Tributes – Specials.

Episodes

Note: The Simpsons 20th Anniversary Special – In 3-D! On Ice!, which aired immediately following "Once Upon a Time in Springfield",  was assigned production number LABF21 and technically counts as a component of the 20th production season (and of the 21st broadcast season).  It does not, however, count towards the series' official animated episode count (i.e., it is not episode 452).

References

Bibliography

External links
Season 21 at The Simpsons.com

Simpsons season 21
2009 American television seasons
2010 American television seasons